Bentonite is an absorbent aluminium phyllosilicate generally impure clay consisting mostly of montmorillonite. There are a few types of bentonites and their names depend on the dominant elements, such as potassium, sodium, calcium, and aluminium. As noted in several places in the geologic literature, there are some nomenclatorial problems with the classification of bentonite clays.

Bentonite usually forms from weathering of volcanic ash, most often in the presence of water. However, the term bentonite, as well as a similar clay called tonstein, have been used for clay beds of uncertain origin. For industrial purposes, two main classes of bentonite exist: sodium bentonite and calcium bentonite.

In stratigraphy and tephrochronology, completely devitrified (weathered volcanic glass) ash-fall beds are commonly referred to as K-bentonites when the dominant clay species is illite. Other common clay species, and sometimes dominant, are montmorillonite and kaolinite. Kaolinite dominated clays are commonly referred to as tonsteins and are typically associated with coal.

List of producing countries
This is a list of countries by bentonite production (tonnes) in 2006 mostly based on British Geological Survey accessed in June 2008.

* indicates "Natural resources of COUNTRY or TERRITORY" links.

References

External links
British Geological Survey World Mineral Statistics		

Lists of countries by mineral production